HXD3C (Chinese:和谐3C型电力机车) is an electric locomotive built in Mainland China by CNR Dalian Locomotives. It is also the first 6-axle dual-service AC electric locomotive in China. It has functions of DC600V train power supply (except HXD3CA) and dual pipe air supply.

Gallery

See also 
 China Railways HXD3
 China Railways HXD3A
 China Railways HXD3B
 China Railways HXD3D
 China Railways HXD3E

References 

25 kV AC locomotives
Co-Co locomotives
HXD3C
CRRC Dalian locomotives
Railway locomotives introduced in 2010
Standard gauge locomotives of China